These are the results of the women's uneven bars competition, one of six events for female competitors in artistic gymnastics at the 1956 Summer Olympics in Melbourne.

Competition format

The gymnastics format continued to use the aggregation format. Each nation entered either a team of six gymnasts or up to three individual gymnasts. All entrants in the gymnastics competitions performed both a compulsory exercise and a voluntary exercise for each apparatus. The 2 exercise scores were summed to give an apparatus total. No separate finals were contested.

Exercise scores ranged from 0 to 10 and apparatus scores from 0 to 20.

Results
The results of the competition:

References

Official Olympic Report
www.gymnasticsresults.com
www.gymn-forum.net

Women's uneven bars
1956 in women's gymnastics
Women's events at the 1956 Summer Olympics